St. John the Baptist Church is an historic Roman Catholic church at 68 Slater Street in Pawtucket, Rhode Island within the Diocese of Providence.

Description

Built in 1925–27, it is very similar to Notre-Dame de Guadalupe Church in Montreal, also designed by Canadian architect Ernest Cormier.  The church is most notable for its particularly lavish interior, which features ceiling artwork by Jean Desauliers and stained glass windows by Mauméjean Frères of Paris.

The church was listed on the National Register of Historic Places in 1983.

See also
 Catholic Church in the United States
 Catholic parish church
 Index of Catholic Church articles
 List of Catholic churches in the United States
 National Register of Historic Places listings in Pawtucket, Rhode Island
 Pastoral care

References

External links 

Official site of the Holy See

Roman Catholic churches completed in 1925
20th-century Roman Catholic church buildings in the United States
Churches in the Roman Catholic Diocese of Providence
Churches on the National Register of Historic Places in Rhode Island
Churches in Providence County, Rhode Island
Buildings and structures in Pawtucket, Rhode Island
Roman Catholic churches in Rhode Island
National Register of Historic Places in Pawtucket, Rhode Island